Mike Stevens (born December 30, 1965) is a Canadian former professional ice hockey player who played 23 games in the National Hockey League with the Vancouver Canucks, Boston Bruins, New York Islanders, and Toronto Maple Leafs. Stevens spent the bulk of his career in the minor American Hockey League, and also spent time in the International Hockey League and Deutsche Eishockey Liga. He is the younger brother of Scott Stevens, who was also played in the NHL and inducted into the Hockey Hall of Fame.

Playing career
Stevens played his junior hockey with the Kitchener Rangers, the same team as his brother Scott, and was selected 58th overall in the 1984 NHL Entry Draft by the Vancouver Canucks. While still playing in Kitchener in 1984–85, he received a surprise six-game callup to the Canucks, recording three assists. However, he would have a difficult transition to pro hockey, struggling to produce in two seasons in Vancouver's farm system with the Fredericton Express of the American Hockey League. He did, however, make himself a physical presence, recording over 200 penalty minutes both years.

Prior to the 1986–87, Stevens was sold to the Boston Bruins. He broke through offensively in the AHL scoring 30 goals, and was called up to the Bruins for seven games, recording an assist. However, he was released by the Bruins after the season and signed with the New York Islanders for the 1987–88 campaign. He would appear in nine games for the Islanders, recording his only NHL goal.

He played one final NHL game for the Toronto Maple Leafs in 1989–90, and played in the minor league systems of the New York Rangers and Calgary Flames during the mid-1990s. His best professional season came in 1992–93, when he recorded 92 points in 68 games for the Binghamton Rangers. In 12 seasons of minor-pro hockey, he recorded 2668 penalty minutes, an average of over 220 per year. He signed at Adler Mannheim 1997, and spent seven seasons there before retiring in 2004.

Stevens appeared in 23 NHL games, recording 1 goal and 4 assists for 5 points.

Career statistics

Regular season and playoffs

External links

1965 births
Living people
Adler Mannheim players
Binghamton Rangers players
Boston Bruins players
Canadian expatriate ice hockey players in Germany
Canadian ice hockey left wingers
Canadian people of Slovak descent
Cincinnati Cyclones (IHL) players
Cleveland Lumberjacks players
ERC Ingolstadt players
Fredericton Express players
Hamburg Freezers players
Ice hockey people from Ontario
Sportspeople from Kitchener, Ontario
Kitchener Rangers players
Maine Mariners players
Manitoba Moose (IHL) players
New York Islanders players
Newmarket Saints players
Saint John Flames players
Schwenninger Wild Wings players
Springfield Indians players
St. John's Maple Leafs players
Toronto Maple Leafs players
Vancouver Canucks draft picks
Vancouver Canucks players